Evgeny Donskoy won the title by defeating Illya Marchenko 6–7(6–8), 6–3, 6–2 in the final.

Seeds

Draw

Finals

Top half

Bottom half

References
 Main Draw
 Qualifying Draw

Siberia Cup - Singles
2012 Singles
Siberia